David K. Stewart (August 27, 1937 – October 16, 1997) was a visual effects artist who was nominated at the 52nd Academy Awards for  Best Visual Effects for Star Trek: The Motion Picture. He shared his nomination with John Dykstra, Grant McCune, Robert Swarthe, Douglas Trumbull and Richard Yuricich.

Selected filmography

Air Force One (1997)
Judge Dredd (1995)
Alien³ (1992)
The Hunt for Red October (1990)
2010 (1984)
The Outsiders (1983)
Blade Runner (1982)
Star Trek: The Motion Picture (1979)
Close Encounters of the Third Kind (1977)

References

External links

1937 births
1997 deaths
Special effects people
Place of birth missing